John Mylne was the name of three Scottish master masons:

John Mylne (d.1621)
John Mylne (d.1657), "John Mylne of Perth", son of the above
John Mylne (1611–1667), "John Mylne junior", son of the above

See also
John Milne (disambiguation)